Richard Pfeiffer Tamburo (February 6, 1930 – February 24, 2020) was an American football player and athletic coach and administrator.  A native of New Kensington, Pennsylvania, he played college football for the Michigan State Spartans football team and was selected by the Associated Press, the International News Service and the Central Press Association as a first-team player on the 1952 College Football All-America Team.  He later went into coaching and intercollegiate athletic administration.  He served as the athletic director at Texas Tech (1978–1980), Arizona State University (1980–1985), and the University of Missouri (1988–1992). Tamburo died in Phoenix on February 24, 2020, aged 90.

References

2020 deaths
American football centers
Arizona State Sun Devils athletic directors
Arizona State Sun Devils football coaches
Iowa Hawkeyes football coaches
Michigan State Spartans football players
Missouri Tigers athletic directors
Texas Tech Red Raiders athletic directors
People from New Kensington, Pennsylvania
Players of American football from Pennsylvania
Educators from Pennsylvania
1930 births